Alternative Left (Spanish language: Izquierda Alternativa, IA) was a Spanish political party with a socialist ideology formed by the union of the Revolutionary Communist League (LCR) and the Communist Movement (MC) in 1991.

History

Foundation
The merger in 1989 of the respective territorial organizations of the MC and the LCR in the Basque Country; Euskadiko Mugimendu Komunista (EMK) and Liga Komunista Iraultzailea (LKI), as Batzarre in Navarre and Zutik in the Basque Autonomous Community, led to calls for a rethinking of the new conditions for unity between the two parties. Finally, an agreed was reached in March 1991 to the unification of the two groups, which was made effective in November 1991. The new organization had a joint leadership of 50 members from the LCR and 50 from the MC. IA had a confederal structure, being formed by the following confederated organizations:
 Liberación in Madrid
 Revolta in Catalonia and the Valencian Country
 Alternative Action in Andalusia
 Inzar in Galiza
 Lliberación in Asturies
 Zutik in the Basque Autonomous Community
 Batzarre in Navarre
 Liberazión in Aragón

Dissolution
IA had a very short life because of the different "styles", culture and political objectives that existed in the two parties. The MC sector planned to evolve to a "non-political party" social collective, that would push for society self-organization, while the LCR defended a classic political party project. Also, the former members of the LCR feared being swallowed by the larger MC.

Finally, Alternative Left split into two nationwide: the LCR group stayed with the name, later to integrate with Jaime Pastor as their main leader, in the United Left in November 1993 (though in the process of infighting the organization lost up to a third of its membership) and the MC group stayed with the name of some of the territorial organizations of IA. The merger, however, survived in Asturias as Lliberación (dissolved in 2010), in Galiza with the name of Inzar (integrated into the BNG and dissolved in 2012), in the Basque Country as Zutik (dissolved in 2011), and in Navarre as Batzarre (integrated in Izquierda-Ezkerra).

References

 Martí Caussa: Historia de la LCR (1970-1991). Editorial Viento Sur, Madrid. 2014.

Political parties established in 1991
Political parties disestablished in 1993
Defunct communist parties in Spain
1991 establishments in Spain
Republican parties in Spain